Forncett Meadows is a  biological Site of Special Scientific Interest west of Long Stratton in Norfolk.

This site in the valley of the River Tas has a variety of grassland types due to variations in soil and wetness and a long history of management by non-intensive grazing. There are also ponds and areas of scrub and alder woodland.

The site is private land but it can be viewed from a footpath which goes through it.

References

Sites of Special Scientific Interest in Norfolk